This is a list of mayors (Oberbürgermeister) and city managers (Oberstadtdirektor) of Aachen, Germany.  The latter office existed from 1946 to 1995.

Mayors (Oberbürgermeister) since 1815
 1815–1820: Cornelius von Guaita
 1820–1831: Wilhelm Daniels and Dr. med. Matthias Solders
 1831–1848: Edmund Emundts
 1848–1851: Arnold Edmund Pelzer
 1851–1875: Johann Contzen
 1875–1883: Ludwig von Weise
 1884–1896: Ludwig Pelzer
 1896–1916: Philipp Veltmann
 1916–1928: Wilhelm Farwick
 1929–1933: Dr. Wilhelm Rombach
 1933–1944: Quirin Jansen
 1944–1945: Franz Oppenhoff
 1945: Dr. Wilhelm Rombach
 1946: Ludwig Kuhnen
 1946–1952: Dr Albert Maas
 1952–1973: Hermann Heusch
 1973–1989: Kurt Malangré, CDU
 1989–2009: Dr. Jürgen Linden, SPD
 2009-2020: Marcel Philipp, CDU
 since 2020: Sibylle Keupen

City managers (Oberstadtdirektoren) 1946–95
 1946–1954: Albert Servais
 1954–1975: Dr. Anton Kurze
 1975–1995: Dr. Heiner Berger

See also
 Timeline of Aachen

References

 
Aachen
North Rhine-Westphalia-related lists
History of Aachen